Adel Nasser Shakroun (born 1970) is a coach and former international Iraqi football player, he played as a midfielder, he is currently working as a coach for Naft Al-Janoob club.

Adel is the older brother of former international player Mohammed Nasser Shakroun.

Coaching career 
Nasser is now leading Naft Al-Junoob SC in 2018-2019 season. He started coaching the basra team from 19 January 2017.

Managerial statistics

Honours

As a manager

Club
Al-Minaa
Thaghr al-Iraq Championship: 2009

References

External links
Profile of Adel Nasser Shakroun on kooora.com
Al-Minaa Club: Sailors of south

1970 births
Iraqi footballers
Iraq international footballers
Association football midfielders
Living people
Sportspeople from Basra
Al-Mina'a SC players
Al-Zawraa SC players
Expatriate footballers in Yemen
Iraqi football managers
Al-Mina'a SC managers